Calthalotia baudini is a species of sea snail, a marine gastropod mollusk in the family Trochidae, the top snails.

Description
The size of the shell attains 15 mm. The rather thick, imperforate shell has a conic-elongate shape. The 6 to 7 whorls are planulate, the first buff, eroded, the following whitish, ornamented with sparse rosy points and angular chestnut streaks. The shell is spirally lirate, with about 8 lirae on the penultimate whorl. The subangular body whorl is depressed above. The base of the shell is convex, with about 8 concentric lirae. Tnere is no umbilical perforation. The aperture is rhomboidal. The lip is simple. The short columella is subnodose-truncate below.

Distribution
This marine species is endemic to Australia and occurs off Western Australia and King Island, South Australia.

References

 John D. Taylor and Emily A. Glover; Diversity and distribution of subtidal benthic molluscs from the Dampier Archipelago, Western Australia; results of the 1999 dredge survey (DA2/99)
 Shirley M. Slack-Smith and Clay W. Bryce; A survey of the benthic molluscs of the Dampier Archipelago, Western Australia

External links
 To World Register of Marine Species
 

baudini
Gastropods of Australia
Gastropods described in 1878